Givira leonera is a moth in the family Cossidae. It is found in Chile.

The length of the forewings is about 13 mm.

References

Natural History Museum Lepidoptera generic names catalog

Givira
Endemic fauna of Chile
Moths described in 1957